Emir Ljubijankić (born 5 May 1992) is a Slovenian footballer who plays for Austrian club SV St. Jakob im Rosental.

Career
In February 2019, Ljubijankić joined NK Sava Kranj. He left the club in the summer 2019 and joined Austrian club SV St. Jakob im Rosental.

References

External links

NZS profile 

1992 births
Living people
Footballers from Ljubljana
Slovenian footballers
Slovenian expatriate footballers
Association football forwards
NK Domžale players
NK Triglav Kranj players
ND Ilirija 1911 players
Borussia Neunkirchen players
Slovenian PrvaLiga players
Slovenian Second League players
Slovenian expatriate sportspeople in Germany
Slovenian expatriate sportspeople in Austria
Expatriate footballers in Germany
Expatriate footballers in Austria